Inchkeith is a community in Saskatchewan.

Unincorporated communities in Saskatchewan
Kingsley No. 124, Saskatchewan
Division No. 5, Saskatchewan